Thomas McLaughlin may refer to:

 Thomas McLaughlin (politician) (1878–1944), Irish nationalist politician
 Thomas H. McLaughlin (1881–1947), American prelate of the Roman Catholic Church
 Thomas D. McLaughlin (1882–?), American architect
 Thomas McLaughlin (engineer) (1896–1971), designer of the Ardnacrusha hydro-electric scheme in Ireland

See also
 Tom McLaughlin (disambiguation)